This is a list of characters for Mashin Sentai Kiramager, a Japanese tokusatsu television series produced by TV Asahi as well as the 44th entry of the Toei Company's long-running Super Sentai franchise and the first to be released in Japan's Reiwa Era. Much of the series takes inspiration from Arabian, Islamic, Persian, Egyptian, Turkic, Hindu and Norse mythology.

Main characters

Kiramagers

In their fight against Yodonheim, the Kiramagers acquired the  bow, which is primarily used by Kiramai Red and allows the five primary Kiramagers to become the armored  for 100 seconds.

As a cover for their mission of protecting Earth, they became CARAT fashion models to gain popularity so people will believe in the Kiramagers' existence.

Juru Atsuta
 is an artistic student of  who loves to draw and the newest member of the team who transforms into . Despite also being the youngest member, he is appointed the leader as he was chosen by the strongest Kiramai Stone, much to his initial dismay before he eventually settles into the role. Before Mabushina recruited him and during his time as a Kiramager, Juru experiences visions of Crystaria and Yodonheim and was visited by Oradin's spirit in his dreams. Near the end of the series, Oradin reveals that these and Juru's Kiramental were a result of him being the chosen hero of Crystaria, taking Galza's place after he was corrupted by Emperor Yodon's influence.

Tametomo Imizu
 is an esports professional who excels in long range combat and transforms into . He acts as an older brother figure and provides assistance when needed. However, he is also a selfish egotist, seeing himself as the Kiramagers' "ace" even when the others disagree. After Juru fails to recognize him, Tametomo develops an antagonistic relationship with him, questioning his every move and talking back to him every so often. This came to a head when a jealous Shovelo convinces Tametomo to take Juru's position away from him, only to get suspended for botching a mission. Though he quits out of anger, the girls help Tametomo realize he never wanted the leadership role anyway and that Juru was always more qualified in the first place. Once he reconciles with the others, Muryo names Tametomo second-in-command of the Kiramagers and grants him the authority to lead should anything happen to Juru.

Sena Hayami
 is a famous track and field athlete who excels in high-speed combat tactics and transforms into . She occasionally causes trouble for everyone around her with her impulsive personality. As a naturally gifted speedster, Sena was once a “Supersonic Princess” of karuta before pursuing her dream as a full-time track and field athlete. She initially distrusts Juru and refuses to accept him as her leader, believing he is selfish. However, after seeing the lengths he went to help her with her career, she grows to accept him and become protective of him.

Shiguru Oshikiri
 is a 24-year-old professional stunt actor who excels in swordsmanship and transforms into . Despite being a popular stuntman, most of his fans are annoyed by his doll-like personality as he rarely shows emotion outside of acting. While he likes to maintain an air of stoicism and coldness, he only does so to contain his true feelings and not be a burden to everyone around him as he believes a hero should suffer in silence. After Juru learns his secret, Shiguru learns to be more open about his feelings and become a trusted friend to Juru.

Sayo Oharu
 is a talented surgeon who excels in aikido, serves as the team's healer, and transforms into . She has an interest in fashion and beauty and always wanted to become a CARAT model. She also displays a dislike of bullies, using her martial arts skills to scare off any who cross her path. However, Sayo is easily distracted by beautiful things such as jewels and flowers, which can detract from important duties unless someone pulls her away.

Takamichi Crystaria
 is a 47-year-old treasure hunter, the long-lost biological older brother of Muryo, and adopted son of Oradin with a highly positive attitude. Three decades prior, a teenage  was introduced to Oradin and befriended him. During an expedition with the Crystarian, a Monstone lodged itself in Takamichi's body. To save him, Oradin revived him as a human-Crystarian hybrid, which slowed down his body's aging process. Following this, Oradin took him to Crystaria and adopted him. After battling Numajo alongside his foster family and apparently losing his foster mother, Mabayuine, Takamichi began to fear for Mabushina's life, so Galza suggested he leave his foster family to search for the four  in order to save her, unaware that it was a ploy for him to leave Crystaria vulnerable to Yodonheim's invasion. When he met the Kiramagers and reunited with Mabushina and Muryo, Takamichi learns of what happened and eventually joins them in fighting Yodonheim. After Mabushina is healed from Numajo's curse, Takamichi continues searching for the Kanaema Stones so he can use their powers to restore Crystaria instead. During his quest, Galza uses Takamichi's Monstone to manipulate him into fighting his allies until Juru extracts it and frees him from Galza's control. After defeating Emperor Yodon, Takamichi and Mabushina return to Crystaria and use the Kanaema Stones to restore it to its former glory. He also erects a mountain monument to his Kiramager teammates in their honor.

Unlike the other Kiramagers, Takamichi utilizes the  brace in order to transform into . While transformed, he wields the  jackhammer, which has a  that can be used as either a gun or a tonfa, as well as perform the  finisher, and a  that can be used as a reach extender. During the events of the stage show Mashin Sentai Kiramager: Final Live Tour 2021, he is able to use the Kiraful Go Arrow to assume his own Go Kiramager form.

Kiramai Mashin
The  are the sentient , which Mabushina brought from Crystaria and serve as the Kiramagers' partners. Through the power of Juru's imagination, the Kiramai Stones are able to transform from their jewel forms into giant vehicles, combine with each other via , and perform the  finisher.
: The  that can transform into a fire engine-like Kiramai Mashin armed with the  rescue ladder/fire hose. He can also transform into , a supercar-like Kiramai Mashin with a resemblance to Mach that utilizes fire-based abilities. While he comes off as angry and brusque, he primarily displays a passionate personality when it comes to battle.
: The  that can transform into an excavator-like Kiramai Mashin armed with the  excavator arm. Due to his old man-like personality, he has a tendency to openly disagree with anything he does not like. Interestingly enough, Tametomo finds him reminiscent of his deceased grandfather.
Like Fire, he can also transform into Makka while being used as part of Land Mage for the  attack. Mach comes off as a charming womanizer, much to Sena and Sayo's annoyance.
: The  that can transform into a jet aircraft-like Kiramai Mashin armed with the  blade. In contrast with his partner, Jetta is excitable and eccentric in personality, though he is much more responsible. He also views his partner as his "brother" and acts as his hype man.
: The  that can transform into a helicopter-like Kiramai Mashin armed with the  blades. She holds her partner to a high regard and constantly compliments her on her appearance.
: The , which originally served as Crystaria's royal train before Galza corrupted and used it as part of Yodonheim's invasion of Earth, that can transform into a steam locomotive train-like Mashin and a dinosaur-like mecha mode called . As Smog Jouki, it can perform the  finisher. After he was executed by Emperor Yodon, Galza used his remaining life force to reactivate Jouki and save Juru, entrusting the boy with his Mashin before departing to the afterlife.
Despite being sentient, Ex and Press do not speak in human language.
: Kiramai Silver's personal drilling vehicle-like Kiramai Mashin with three drills and two grip arms created by CARAT for underground excavation. Unlike the other Mashin, Drijum lacks a stone mode, as it has a separate Kiramai Stone as its core, and speaks in computerized beeps while the others speak clear human language. Before gaining the power to become Gigant Driller, Drijum was named .
: The , which has purification capabilities, can transform into a Shinkansen-like Kiramai Mashin with shark-like features, and split into multiple weapons for the Kiramagers' other mecha to use.
: The , able to transform into an aircraft-like Kiramai Mashin that can combine with Fire, Shovelo, Mach, Jetta, and Heliko to assume  for increased firepower. He was Oradin's caretaker and teacher who was vacationing on Earth when Crystaria was attacked by Yodonheim and became inconsolable due to the king's death until Shiguru's acting made him cry, leading to him joining the Kiramagers. He is voiced by 

Mashin Weapons
The Mashin Weapons are created from auxiliary Kiramai Stones that the Kiramagers obtain during their adventures and can convert into weapons for their mecha.
: The  that can transform into a forklift-like Kiramai Mashin and a giant trident.
: The  that can transform into a road roller-like Kiramai Mashin and a giant rolling pin.
: The  that can transform into a truck-like Kiramai Mashin and a giant shield.
: The  that can transform into a garbage truck-like Kiramai Mashin and a giant vacuum cleaner.
: The  that can transform into a concrete mixer truck-like Kiramai Mashin and a giant gun.

Mashin Giants
The Mashin Giants are the Kiramagers' mecha.
: An alternate combination formed only by Fire, Shovelo, and Mach.
: An alternate combination formed only by Jetta and Heliko.
While Galza was in control of Mashin Jouki, he could hinder the Kiramagers' ability to use King Express by taking control of and forcibly separating the mech if necessary or denying them his Mashin outright if he so chooses.
: An alternate version of King Express formed when Mashin Express combines with Mashin Zabyu-n in place of Mashin Jouki. In the film Mashin Sentai Kiramager the Movie: Be-Bop Dream, Juru combines his Kiramental with the Dream Stone's power to reform King Express Zabyu-n into the twin barreled , allowing Kiramaizin and Gigant Driller to perform the  finisher.
: An alternate version of King Express formed when Galza gains the ability to forcibly combine Mashin Express with Mashin Jouki and assume direct control later in the series.
It is armed with the twin , which can be combined into the double-bladed .

Recurring characters

Yodonheim
The  is an evil empire of dark beings under the command of Emperor Yodon that conquered Crystaria with their  invasion force before setting their sights on Earth. Their main objective is to destroy everything that is beautiful in the universe. After Emperor Yodon's death, Carantula reorganizes Yodonheim and maintains a good relationship with Earth and Crystaria.

Emperor Yodon
 is the mysterious leader of Yodonheim who possesses two additional personalities. He was originally a conglomerate of serpents born from the embodiment of corruption who rose to power after creating his own Jamen and devouring his defeated opponents, assimilating their powers while increasing in size. Yodon subconsciously created Yodonna and Shadon to use them as protective guises so he can safely travel to other worlds not consumed in darkness. Years prior to the series, he corrupted a young Galza into resenting his kingdom, which eventually led to Crystaria's destruction and Oradin's defeat.

Initially acting from the shadows, Yodon came to Earth as Yodonna to assist his generals in invading Earth before eventually revealing himself. Sometime after Shadon's destruction, Yodon absorbs Galza as a replacement and is seemingly killed by his traitorous general. However, the emperor drops the ruse after Juru reveals the existence of the Kanaema Stones and proceeds to invade Earth to hunt the artifacts and reshape the entire universe to his liking. After being tricked into removing his Jamen, Yodon is ultimately destroyed by a fatal shot to his exposed head from Juru's Kiraful Go Arrow finisher enhanced by the  Kanaema Stone.

Yodon's other selves are represented by a pair of masks, each of which hang off his Jamen and covers his main mask when he takes on their appearance. As his alternate personalities are separate beings unto their own, Yodon can communicate with them through their Yodon Changers. On his own, Emperor Yodon is capable of unleashing a mass of darkness from his body and laying waste to several city blocks. As a conglomerate of darkness, Yodon is incapable of sustaining himself in pristine and beautiful areas without switching to one of his alternate personalities. He can also summon an army of Emperor Guard Bechats to aid him in battle.

Yodonna
 is an alternate personality of Emperor Yodon who initially believed herself to be his private secretary. She arrives on Earth to support Galza and Carantula due to the Kiramagers' interference in their invasion plans. While Yodonna maintains her loyalty to Yodon, he executes her after she becomes a liability in his fight against the Kiramagers, embracing her demise if it meant Yodon would be victorious.

In her titular web-exclusive series, Yodonna ends up in the Yodon afterlife to await judgment. However, she steals a revival device and returns to Earth in the hopes of possessing the Kiramagers' leader Juru Atsuta and use his life force to revive herself, only to accidentally end up in the body of his girlfriend, Mizuki Kakihara. Yodonna settles for this development, but is forced to protect Kakihara from Yakuza members that the latter's detective brother was investigating. In the process, Yodonna befriends Kakihara and they help each other learn emotions and work on her attitude respectively. As a result of their friendship, Yodonna only siphons enough energy from Kakihara to temporarily sustain her physical form, destroy the revival device, and save Kakihara from Yakuza leader, . Afterward, Yodonna returns to the Yodon afterlife, but realizes she can revive herself if she learns to love.

She can transform from her human form to her Yodonheim uniform using the Yodon Changer. She is also armed with the  riding crop that can enhance Yodonheim members at great cost to them or divide whomever she hits into five duplicates of themselves, each of which embody a different personality trait and can merge back at their leisure. In her titular web-exclusive series, she gains access to a new, more powerful battle form called .

Shadon
 is an alternate personality of Emperor Yodon's who believes himself to be a hunter and his direct messenger. He is armed with the  sniper rifle and, like Yodonna, is equipped with a Yodon Changer. He is destroyed by Go Kiramai Yellow.

Galza
He is Oradin's younger brother, Mabushina's biological uncle, and Takamichi's foster uncle.

Once an idealistic young Crystarian and one of the chosen heroes of his home planet, Galza's mind was corrupted from an early age by Emperor Yodon, causing the former to resent Oradin and everything he cherishes as well as have no memory of his encounter with Yodon. As an adult, Galza believed himself more worthy of becoming king than Oradin due to his stronger Kiramental, with the resulting jealousy and resentment over being denied the throne driving him to side with Yodonheim. He subsequently became general of the Yodon Army, overseeing the attack on Crystaria before tracking Mabushina to Earth. Amidst his battles with the Kiramagers, Galza develops a rivalry with Juru after seeing similarities between him and Oradin as well as cultivate a dark power similar to Kiramental fueled by his negative emotions; which Carantula later calls . Following Oradin's revival as Mashin Oradin, Galza hones his Jamental further to compete with his brother's growing powers, obtaining the ability to brainwash the Kiramagers' Mashin into his service.

When Juru breaks into Yodonheim and reveals the Crystarian's forgotten past, Galza realizes he had been manipulated and attempts to atone for his misdeeds, only for Yodon to remove Galza and fatally wound him. Despite this, Galza uses the last of his life force to save Juru, entrusting him with Mashin Jouki before making peace with Oradin and departing to the afterlife.

Carantula
He is armed with the  spear and is able to create  masks to convert Bechats into Jamenshi and Dark Beasts into Jamen Beasts, storing the dark energy created by the former during their attacks in his staff to summon the latter.

However, after Yodonna splits him into five duplicates and the Kiramagers destroy the one embodying his loyalty to Emperor Yodon, Carantula becomes frustrated by Yodonna's subsequent abuse and bonds with Juru as a fellow artist. The former quits his position in Yodonheim and is almost executed by Yodon, but Galza saves Carantula to help him betray the emperor. Carantula later grants the Kiramagers access to Yodonheim and reclaims the  Kanaema Stone for their final fight against Yodon. After Yodon's death, Carantula takes over leadership of Yodonheim and stops invading other planets.

Bechats
The  are the Yodon Army's foot soldiers armed with the  rakes. With a Jamen, a Bechat can be promoted to a Jamenshi. Through the power of Yodonna, a Bechat can become a zombie-like  with increased strength, but at the cost of expiring soon after. In the final fight against Emperor Yodon, the dark ruler summons  as reinforcements.

Other members
After being promoted, she attracted the attention of Oradin, Mabayuine, and Takamichi while placing curses on Crystarians. During their fight, she poisoned the Aqua Kiramai Stone to disable its purifying powers. She was killed by Oradin, but she used her dying breath to inflict Mabayuine with a death curse that nearly destroys Mabushina as well in the present. Using the  Kanaema Stone, the Kiramagers travel to the past and obtain a sample of Numajo's poison before she is destroyed by Oradin in order to create an antidote and restore the Aqua Kiramai Stone. By the present, Yodonna salvages Numajo's Jamen to poison Shiguru, but Tametomo is able to help him destroy the mask and cure him.
Initially appearing the past during the series, Minjo returns during the events of the film Mashin Sentai Kiramager the Movie: Be-Bop Dream, having assumed her own human form. When Yodonheim invaded Crystaria, she stole the sentient  from the Crystarian royal palace and put her cursed tag on it to manipulate the  dream world that the stone creates. She then traps Galza and the Kiramagers in Yumeria, intending to kill them all so she can become Yodonheim's top general. However, her plan is foiled and she turns herself into a Jamen that latches onto Remudon to become Minjo Remudon, resulting in her demise.

Jamenshi
The  are Bechats enhanced by a Jamen tasked with overseeing the gathering of  needed to open an invasion gate for a Jamen Beast to emerge from. Due to a debt contract with Carantula, part of a Jamenshi's energy can be used to complete the summoning ritual if they fail to gather enough dark energy before they are destroyed.

: A rugby-themed monster. He is destroyed by Kiramai Green.
: A vise-themed monster. He is destroyed by Kiramai Blue.
: A Neanderthal-themed monster. He is destroyed off-screen by the Kiramagers.
: A joystick-themed monster. He is destroyed by Kiramai Red.
: A digital camera-themed monster. He is crushed by Cloud Hildon.
: A refrigerator-themed monster and Oven Jamen's younger brother. He is destroyed by Galza.
: An oven-themed monster and Freezer Jamen's older brother. He is destroyed by the Kiramagers.
: A Hyakunin Isshu-themed monster. He is destroyed by the Kiramagers.
: A music-themed monster. He is destroyed by Kiramai Blue.
: A reset button-themed monster. He is destroyed by Galza.
: A meteorite-themed monster. He is destroyed by Kiramai Silver.
: A steam locomotive-themed monster. He is crushed by Diesel Basura.
: A marshmallow-themed monster. He is destroyed by Kiramai Silver.
: A Whac-A-Mole-themed monster. He is destroyed by Kiramai Yellow.
: A relocation-themed monster. He is destroyed by Kiramai Silver.
: An adhesive-themed monster. He is destroyed by Kiramai Yellow and Silver.
: A fishing rod-themed monster. He is destroyed by Kiramai Silver.
: A safe-themed monster. He is destroyed by Kiramai Red.
: A loudspeaker-themed monster. He is destroyed by Kiramai Silver.
: A bomb-themed monster.
: A superglue-themed monster and Setchakuzai Jamen's younger brother. He is destroyed by Go Kiramai Red.
: A mannequin-themed monster. He is destroyed by Go Kiramai Blue.
: A riddle-themed monster. He is destroyed by Go Kiramai Red.
: A golf-themed monster. He is destroyed by Kiramai Red.
: A tooth decay-themed monster. He is destroyed by Kiramai Blue.
: A wire-themed monster. He is destroyed by Go Kiramai Red.
: A Maneki-neko-themed monster. He is destroyed by Go Kiramai Red.

Other Jamenshi
: A film-themed monster who later merges with the Kantoku Minosaurs to become the Movie Minosaur, only to be destroyed by Kiramaizin and KishiryuOh Five Knights.
: Another superglue-themed monster.
: A camera-themed monster.

Jamen Beasts
The  are giant monsters that were originally Yodonheim animals known as  before being equipped with a Jamen. A Jamen Beast is summoned from an invasion gate after a Jamenshi fills the gauge on Carantula's staff with Dark Energy and will attempt to create bigger summoning circles to bring Yodonheim's main forces to the planet unless they are destroyed before then. Among the different types of Dark Beasts are the leech-like , the crayfish-like , the river snail-like , the black bass-like , the two-headed giant water bug-like , and the vampire squid-like .

: A Hildon outfitted with a tap-themed Jamen. It is destroyed by the Kiramai Mashin.
: A Regani outfitted with a rugby-themed Jamen. It is destroyed by Land Mage.
: A Shelga outfitted with a vise-themed Jamen. It is destroyed by Kiramaizin.
: A Basura outfitted with a Paleolithic stone tool-themed Jamen. It is destroyed by Smog Jouki.
: A Regani outfitted with a claw crane-themed Jamen. It is destroyed by Kiramaizin.
: A Hildon outfitted with a cloud storage-themed Jamen. It is destroyed by Land Mage Lifton Rollerand.
: A Dagames whose heads are outfitted with two temperature-themed Jamen: one cold-themed and the other heat-themed. It is destroyed by King Express.
: A Basura outfitted with a Heian-kyō-themed Jamen. It is destroyed by King Express.
: A Shelga outfitted with a stage-themed Jamen. It is destroyed by Kiramaizin.
: A Regani outfitted with a launch button-themed Jamen. It is destroyed by Kiramaizin Express.
: A Shelga outfitted with a Venus flytrap-themed Jamen. It is destroyed by Land Mage.
: A Basura outfitted with a diesel locomotive-themed Jamen. It is destroyed by Kiramaizin Duston and King Express.
: A Hildon outfitted with a quoits-themed Jamen. It is destroyed by Kiramaizin Duston.
: A Regani outfitted with a missile battery-themed Jamen. It is destroyed by Kiramaizin Magellan.
: A Basura outfitted with a hammer-themed Jamen. It is destroyed by Gigant Driller.
: A Dagames whose heads are outfitted with two mortgage loan-themed Jamen: one house-themed and the other money-themed. It is destroyed by Kiramaizin.
: A Shelga outfitted with an adhesive-themed Jamen. It is destroyed by Kiramai Driller.
: A Basura outfitted with a motorboat-themed Jamen. It is destroyed by King Express Zabyu-n.
: A Regani outfitted with a gold bar-themed Jamen. It is destroyed by King Express Zabyu-n.
: A Hildon outfitted with a jukebox-themed Jamen. It is destroyed by Kiramaizin.
: A Shelga outfitted with a superglue-themed Jamen. It is destroyed by Mashin Mach.
: A Gomoryu outfitted with a projector-themed Jamen. It is destroyed by Grateful Phoenix.
: A Hildon outfitted with a mannequin torso-themed Jamen. It is destroyed by Grateful Phoenix.
: A Dagames whose heads are outfitted with two screen pinching-themed Jamen: one pinch in-themed and the other pinch out-themed. It is destroyed by Grateful Phoenix.
: A Regani outfitted with a tank-themed Jamen. It is destroyed along with Sengoku Basura and Shield Shelga by Grateful Phoenix.
: A Basura outfitted with a Sengoku period/kabuto-themed Jamen and armed with a pair of nihonto. It is destroyed along with Tank Regani and Shield Shelga by Grateful Phoenix.
: A Shelga outfitted with a shield/tiki-themed Jamen. It is destroyed along with Tank Regani and Sengoku Basura by Grateful Phoenix.
: A Hildon outfitted with a golf cart-themed Jamen. It is destroyed by Smog Jouki.
: A Gomoryu outfitted with a direct-drive turntable-themed Jamen. It is destroyed by Kiramaizin, King Express Zabyu-n, Gigant Driller, and Grateful Phoenix.
: A Basura outfitted with a fang/foothold trap-themed Jamen. It is destroyed by Grateful Phoenix.
: A Shelga outfitted with a self-consciousness-themed Jamen. It is destroyed by Land Mage.
: A Regani outfitted with a canned cat food-themed Jamen. It is destroyed by Gigant Driller.

Other Jamen Beasts
: A , a human-sized ram-like Dark Beast, that serves Minjo. It is later enlarged by Carantula and equipped with the Jamen that Minjo converts herself into. It and Minjo are destroyed by Kiramaizin, Gigant Driller, and King Express Zabyu-n.

Crystaria
The  is a beautiful planet made up of gemstones. Prior to the series' beginning, the planet was invaded by the Yodonheim Empire, though its sole surviving heir was able to escape. After the Kiramagers defeat Emperor Yodon, Crystaria is restored to its former glory via the power of the four Kanaema Stones.

Mabushina
 is the princess of Crystaria, Takamichi's foster sister, Oradin's daughter, and sole heir to his throne. When Yodonheim invaded the planet, Mabushina fled to Earth with the Kiramai Stones upon her father's instruction and recruited the Kiramagers. She was initially very close to and fond of Takamichi, but grew to resent him because of his absence during Yodonheim's invasion; even going so far as to blame him for Oradin's death. After Tametomo and Shiguru help her realize she had more to do with what happened to her father than Takamichi did, Mabushina reconciles with her foster brother. When she is afflicted by Numajo's curse, she learns the true reason as to why her brother left Crystaria. After returning to her home planet and using the Kanaema Stones to restore it, Mabushina is crowned Queen of Crystaria as both of her parents had lost their physical bodies.

Oradin
 is Mabushina's father, Takamichi's foster father, friend of Muryo's, and the king of Crystaria who was killed during Yodonheim's invasion when his younger brother, Galza, aligned himself with their enemy. Although his body was being kept by Yodonheim, his spirit began providing advice to Juru. Three decades prior, he met Muryo and Takamichi's father and adopted the latter after saving him from a Monstone. Ever since, Oradin kept in contact with the Hakataminami family. He also clashed with Numajo, who cursed his family in retaliation. After Juru rescues his soul from Yodonheim, Oradin fuses himself with the Miracle Stone and returns as Mashin Oradin.

Mabayuine
 is Oradin's wife, Mabushina's mother, Takamichi's foster mother, and the queen of Crystaria. Decades prior, she was seemingly killed by Numajo's curse. This prompted Takamichi to return to Earth in search of the Kanaema Stones upon realizing that Mabushina could fall victim to the curse as well. However, Takamichi and Mabushina eventually learn that before she died, Mabayuine transferred her life energy to her headdress' jewel and can be revived from it once she regains her energy.

CARAT
Though it was originally founded to fight off Yodonheim, CARAT has also become involved in financing buildings, vehicles, as well as a fashion model agency that the Kiramagers work at as a cover for their heroic duties. CARAT also serves as the Kiramagers' base and shelter for Mabushina and her family after their home planet is destroyed. In their fight against Yodonheim, CARAT receives support from the sporting goods company SCRTC, Sena's athletics sponsor who had previously supported the Kiramagers' predecessors, the Gekirangers.

Muryo Hakataminami
 is the 45-year-old founder of CARAT and younger brother of Takamichi who provides support to the Kiramagers against Yodonheim's invasion of Earth. He is also the CEO of the jewelry company  and a family friend of Oradin's after the king met Muryo's father, acting as a father figure to the Kiramagers and Mabushina. While Oradin sensed his Kiramental and offered to make him a Kiramager when he was 15, Muryo chose to help the Crystarian in a support role as opposed to a combat role.

Mizuki Kakihara
 is Juru Atsuta's classmate, later girlfriend, who views everyone around her as boring or mediocre and puts on a cheerful, perfect front to hide her true cunning yet mean-spirited personality. She is initially unaware of Atsuta's work with the Kiramagers until they get stuck together due to Setchakuzai Jamen's adhesive-related powers. As a result, they learn each other's secrets and eventually start going out together.

During the events of the web-exclusive series Yodonna, Kakihara is possessed by the spirit of the titular character, who intended to use Atsuta's life force to revive herself. Yodonna starts to use Kakihara's life force instead, but the two end up bonding and teaching each other about emotions, with the former helping the latter work on her attitude. In light of their friendship, Yodonna separates herself from Kakihara and sacrifices herself to save the latter from a Yakuza leader that Kakihara's detective brother, was investigating.

Monstones
 are parasitic stone monsters that can merge with lifeforms. One such monster merged with Takamichi three decades prior, leading Oradin to fuse his body with the Shining Kiramai Stone in order to save him. In the present, Galza uses his Jamental to turn it into a stronger  to take control of Takamichi until Juru extracted it from his body using the Destoria Kanaema Stone. After a Monstone absorbed the  Kanaema Stone into its body, it enlarged into a giant form and gained superhuman strength, but was destroyed by Gigant Driller.

Guest characters
: A sporting goods company, Sena's athletics sponsor, and a front for the  martial arts school that had previously supported the Kiramagers' predecessors, the Gekirangers, and currently supports CARAT in their fight against Yodonheim.
: The chairman of SCRTC, master of the  fighting style, and ally of the Gekirangers.
: Miki's daughter, head of SCRTC's Japanese branch, master of the  fighting style, ally of the Gekirangers, and a friend of Sena's from college who facilitated SCRTC sponsoring her.

References

Super Sentai characters
, Mashin Sentai Kiramager